Lima (also Romanized as Līmā) is a village in Eshkevar-e Sofla Rural District, Rahimabad District, Rudsar County, Gilan Province, Iran. At the 2006 census, its population was 237, in 81 families.

References 

Populated places in Rudsar County